Caió is a sector in the Cacheu Region of Guinea-Bissau. Its population is 12,696 (2009 census). The island Pecixe is part of the sector.

Climate
Caió has a tropical savanna climate (Aw) with little to no rainfall from November to May and heavy to very heavy rainfall from June to October.

References

Cacheu Region
Sectors of Guinea-Bissau
Populated places in Guinea-Bissau